Thanks I'll Eat It Here is the only solo album by rock and roll singer-songwriter Lowell George. While George is best known for his work with Little Feat, by 1977 Lowell felt that they were moving increasingly into jazz-rock, a form in which he felt little interest. As a result, he began working on his own album. Thanks I'll Eat It Here is an eclectic mix of styles reminiscent of Little Feat's earlier albums – in particular Dixie Chicken, on which the track "Two Trains" originally appeared. The album was released just before the death of Lowell George in 1979 and has cover art by Neon Park (a feature of almost all Little Feat albums) containing several pop-/cult references including a picnic scene, mirroring Édouard Manet's Le déjeuner sur l'herbe, which shows Bob Dylan, Fidel Castro and Marlene Dietrich as Der Blaue Engel with an open copy of Howl beside them.

Track listing
Unusual for a first solo album from a singer-songwriter, of the nine tracks on the original release only four were written by George, and of these three were collaborations. "What Do You Want the Girl to Do", "Easy Money" and "Can't Stand the Rain" were cover versions.

Timings of tracks are shown as minutes:seconds.

Side One
 "What Do You Want the Girl to Do" (Allen Toussaint) – 4:46
 "Honest Man" (Lowell George, Fred Tackett) – 3:45
 "Two Trains" (George) – 4:32
 "I Can't Stand the Rain" (Ann Peebles, Don Bryant, Bernie Miller) – 3:21

Side Two
 "Cheek to Cheek" (George, Van Dyke Parks, Martin Kibbee (aka Fred Martin)) – 2:23
 "Easy Money" (Rickie Lee Jones) – 3:29
 "Twenty Million Things" (George, Jed Levy) – 2:50
 "Find a River" (Tackett) – 3:45
 "Himmler's Ring" (Jimmy Webb) – 2:28

CD bonus track
 "Heartache" (with Valerie Carter) (George, Ivan Ulz) – 2:28

Cover art
The cover, painted by Neon Park, is a version of Édouard Manet's famous painting Le déjeuner sur l'herbe with Marlene Dietrich, Fidel Castro and Bob Dylan as the diners.

Personnel
Although they do not play together on any single track, Richie Hayward and Bill Payne, both members of Little Feat, play on the album. George was also able to call on the services of top-class session players and backing vocalists.

Lowell George – guitar, vocals, production
Bonnie Raitt – vocals
James Newton Howard – keyboards
Chuck Rainey – bass
Denny Christianson – keyboards, horns
David Foster – keyboards
Chilli Charles – drums
Nicky Hopkins – keyboards 
Jim Price – horns
Jim Keltner – drums
Jim Gordon – drums
Michael Baird – drums 
Dennis Belfield – bass
Bobby Bruce – violin, guitar
Turner Stephen Bruton – guitar 
Luis Damian – guitar, keyboards
Gordon DeWitty – keyboards, piano
Maxine Dixon – piano 
Arthur Gerst – piano
Jimmy Greenspoon – guitar, piano
Roberto Gutierrez – vocals, guitar, drums
Richie Hayward – drums
Jerry Jumonville – saxophone, guitar
Ron Koss – guitar, engineering
Darrell Leonard – horn, vocals
Maxayn Lewis – vocals
David Paich – keyboards
Jeff Porcaro – drums
Dean Parks – guitar, keyboards
Bruce Paulson – keyboards
Bill Payne – keyboards, vocals
Herb Pedersen – vocals 
Joel Peskin – vocals, saxophone
John Phillips – saxophone, drums 
Peggy Sandvig – piano
James Self – tuba
Steve Madaio – horns
Floyd Sneed – drums, vocals 
J.D. Souther – bass, vocals 
Paul Stallworth – bass, guitar
Fred Tackett – guitar, vocals
Maxine Willard Waters – vocals
Michael Ward  –  Truck Driver and Drum Tech
Gene Vano – Road Manager

Additional personnel
Brad Kanawyer, Michael Hollyfield – design
Neon Park – cover art
Elizabeth George, Bob Marks, Nancy Goldfarb – photography
Donn Landee, George Massenburg – engineering
Billy Youdelman, Bruce Botnick, Doug Botnick – assistant engineering
Richard Hayward, Lee Herschberg – digital mastering

Charts
Album

References

Lowell George albums
1979 debut albums
Warner Records albums
Albums produced by Lowell George
Albums recorded at Sunset Sound Recorders
Albums with cover art by Neon Park